Year 1416 (MCDXVI) was a leap year starting on Wednesday (link will display the full calendar) of the Julian calendar.

Events

January–December 
 January 27 – The Republic of Ragusa is the first state in Europe to outlaw slavery.
 May 29 – Battle of Gallipoli: Venetian admiral Pietro Loredan destroys the Ottoman fleet.
 May 30 – The Catholic Church burns Jerome of Prague as a heretic.

Date unknown 
 The Trezzo sull'Adda Bridge (the longest arch bridge in the world at the time) is destroyed.
 The Hussite Bible is completed by Tamás Pécsi and Bálint Újlaki.

Births 
 February 26 – Christopher of Bavaria (d. 1448)
 March 27 – Antonio Squarcialupi, Italian organist and composer (d. 1480)
 March 28 – Jodha of Mandore, Ruler of Marwar (d. 1489)
 May 25 – Jakobus, nobleman from Lichtenberg in the northern part of Alsace (d. 1480)
 October 26 – Edmund Grey, 1st Earl of Kent (d. 1490)
 date unknown
 Benedetto Cotrugli, Ragusan/Croatian merchant, economist, scientist, diplomat and humanist (d. 1469)
 Pal Engjëlli, Albanian Catholic clergyman (d. 1470)
 Francis of Paola, founder of the Order of the Minims (d. 1507)
 Piero di Cosimo de' Medici, ruler of Florence (d. 1469)
 probable – Jacquetta of Luxembourg, English duchess and countess (d. 1472)

Deaths 
 February 2 – Racek Kobyla of Dvorce, Bohemian Hetman and Burgrave.
 February 27 – Eleanor of Castile, queen consort of Navarre (b. c. 1363)
 April 2 – King Ferdinand I of Aragon (b. 1379)
 May 21 – Anna of Celje, queen consort of Poland (b. c. 1381)
 May 30 – Jerome of Prague, Czech theologian (executed) (b. 1379)
 June 15 – John, Duke of Berry, son of John II of France (b. 1340)
September 4 – John I, Count of Nassau-Siegen, German count
 October 1 – Yaqub Spata, lord of Arta 
 October 14 – Henry the Mild, Duke of Brunswick-Lüneburg
 December 29 – Mathew Swetenham, bowbearer of Henry IV
 date unknown – The Limbourg brothers, painters of the Très Riches Heures du Duc de Berry.
 probable
Owain Glyndŵr, Welsh prince and leader of the Welsh Revolt
Julian of Norwich, English anchoress, mystic and author

References